Women's Downhill World Cup 1968/1969

Final point standings

In Women's Downhill World Cup 1968/69 the best 3 results count. Deductions are given in brackets.

References
 fis-ski.com

External links
 

Women's Downhill
FIS Alpine Ski World Cup women's downhill discipline titles